Cathy Conheim LCSW is a psychotherapist and the author of several children's books.

Works

External links 
Henry's World web site
San Diego Pets Magazine 2013
San Diego Pets Magazine 2012
Pets Lounge TV program
UT San Diego, ASPCA "Cat of the Year" (national award)

 
Canidae
Animal Planet
Cat Fancy magazine
Fido Friendly Magazine

Living people
American children's writers
Year of birth missing (living people)